Hiles is an unincorporated community in the town of Hiles, Forest County, Wisconsin, United States.

History
A post office called Hiles was established in 1903, and remained in operation until it was discontinued in 1968. The community was named for F. P. Hiles, a lumber baron.

Religion
Christ Lutheran Church is a church of the Wisconsin Evangelical Lutheran Synod in Hiles.

References

Unincorporated communities in Forest County, Wisconsin
Unincorporated communities in Wisconsin